Labeo (Latin for "lip") is a genus of carp with distinctive lip hangings.

The name Labeo may refer to:

 Pacuvius Labeo (d. 42 BC), Roman jurist and assassin of Julius Caesar
 Marcus Antistius Labeo (d. 10 or 11 AD), noted jurist
 Attius Labeo (1st century AD), much derided Roman poet 
 Claudius Labeo (1st century AD), military leader in the Batavian rebellion
 Cornelius Labeo (3rd century AD), scholar of ancient Roman religion
 Notker Labeo, (b. c.950, d. 1022), medieval German monk